Window Rock Airport  is a public use airport located  south of the central business district of Window Rock, in Apache County, Arizona, United States. It is owned by the Navajo Nation.

This is one of six airports owned by the Navajo Nation; the other five being Chinle Airport (E91), Kayenta Airport (0V7) and Tuba City Airport (T03) in Arizona, plus Crownpoint Airport (0E8) and Shiprock Airport (5V5) in New Mexico.

Although most U.S. airports use the same three-letter location identifier for the FAA and IATA, this airport is assigned RQE by the FAA, but has no designation from the IATA. Prior to December 1998, its FAA identifier was P34.

Facilities and aircraft 
It has one runway designated 2/20 with an asphalt surface measuring 7,000 by 75 feet (2,134 x 23 m). For the 12-month period ending April 14, 2011, the airport had 5,000 general aviation aircraft operations, an average of 13 per day.

References

External links 
 Window Rock Airport (RQE) at Arizona DOT airport directory
 Window Rock Airport at Navajo Air Transportation Department
 Aerial image as of 25 June 1997 from USGS The National Map

Airports in Apache County, Arizona
Navajo Nation airports